Judah is a Jewish surname. Notable people with the surname include:

 Ben Judah (born 1988), British journalist and author
 Gerry Judah (born 1951), British artist and designer
 Henry M. Judah (1821–1866), American soldier
 Marietta Judah (1812–1883), American stage actress
 Theodore Judah (1826–1863), American engineer who dreamed of the first transcontinental railroad
 Tim Judah (born 1962), British historian and journalist
 Yoel Judah (born 1956), American kickboxer, boxer and trainer; 3-times world champion
 Zab Judah "Super" (born 1977), American welterweight boxer; world junior champion and world champion

Jewish surnames